Dirty Drawers Canyon [elevation: ] is a valley in Otero County, New Mexico, in the United States.

According to local history, Dirty Drawers Canyon was named for a woman whose personal hygiene was in question, like her reputation.

References

Landforms of Otero County, New Mexico
Valleys of New Mexico